Surjit Khan is a Punjabi musician and singer-songwriter. His album in 2009 Headliner which Ravi Bal produced Surjit Khan's Album. His two old albums which Sukhpal Sukh produced are Dupatta in 2006 & Neendraan in 2007. Surjit Khan's New Film called Meri Chargay Jawani Sohniyeh which Joy-Atul will be producing.  He is of Indian descent. His new album will be out in August 2014 called "Qawali" composed by: Tru-Skool, Jeeti, Kubs Matharu & Gupsy Aujla.

Discography

Filmography

References

Bhangra (music)
English Sikhs
People from Birmingham, West Midlands
Living people
English people of Indian descent
Punjabi people
1972 births

ar:سوكشيندر شيندا